Yang Lin may refer to:

Yang Lin (Water Margin), a fictional character in the Water Margin
Yang Lin (footballer), Chinese footballer